The 1969 Big League World Series took place from August 12–16 in Winston-Salem, North Carolina, United States. Barstow, California defeated host Winston-Salem in the championship game. This was the final BLWS held in Winston-Salem.

This year marked the first appearance of a Canadian team.

Teams

Results

References

Big League World Series
Big League World Series